The Macau Pass (formerly the Transmac IC Card and stylised as MACAU Pass) is a contactless smartcard, first introduced by Transmac in 1999, that can be used to pay for bus fares, shop, and dine with many more merchants to join the system.

It's a member of the Ministry of Housing and Urban-Rural Development City Union systems.

Acceptance

The Macau Pass is accepted by:

Transport
Transmac
TCM
Public Car Parks
Macau Light Rapid Transit, since 24 May 2022.

Vending machines
Vitasoy vending machines
Coca-Cola vending machines
"24" Mini-store and vending

Supermarkets
DCH Food Mart Deluxe (World Trade Center)
San Miu Supermarkets
US Mart Limited
Soi Cheung Supermarket
Tai Fung Supermarket
Weng Kei Supermarkets

Convenience Stores
Circle K
7-Eleven

Shopping and services
Select CTM stores
Transmac and Macau Pass Service centers
 J.T. Ticket Net Machines
Select Ricoh Photocopiers
Macau Cultural Center
Creative Photo Studio
Q&A
S.J. Hospital Automatic Registration System
Macao Science Center
Polytechnic Institute
Canon

Food and beverage
McDonald's
Selected Padaria da Guia stores
Selected Mario Bakeries
Selected U Veng Kei Restaurants (In Service Soon)
Snowball Cafe and Bakery
Jollibee
Starbucks
Pacific Coffee
Tom N Toms Coffee
Rethink Coffee
Élysée Bakery
KOI Thé
Comebuy

Card types
The Macau Pass has four types of different cards, for certain age groups (much like the Octopus card in Hong Kong). The four are:

Adult (Green) (deposit of MOP$30.00 is required for card purchase)
Personalised (Pink/Sky Blue)
Elders (Pink)
Students/Child (Sky Blue)

Features
Macau Pass has a variety of uses. They are:

 Parking Systems (saves parking ticket issuing, therefore environmentally-friendly)
 Restriction Gates (must use a personalized Macau Pass, with the feature added)
 Apartment Recognition (for apartments with a security feature, must use card for access)
 VIP Cards

Payment discounts
The Macau Pass does not have any discount when purchasing merchandise and using at restaurants. However, the government and the company had decided that the government will subsidize the difference from the discounts below on bus fares. The Transmac IC Card did not accept this offer.

Adult/personalised card holders can enjoy a discounted bus fare of:
 MOP$3.00 bus fare on regular routes.(including night buses)
 MOP$4.00 bus fare on express routes.(including 3AX, 3X, 5AX, 5X, 10X, 25AX, 30X, 101X, 102X, AP1X)

Student/child card holders enjoy a discount on bus fare of:
 MOP$1.50 bus fare on regular routes.(including night buses)
 MOP$2.00 bus fare on express routes.(including 3AX, 3X, 5AX, 5X, 10X, 25AX, 30X, 101X, 102X, AP1X)

Elders/disabled card holders are exempt from bus fares.

Transfer discounts
When Macau Pass was still called the "Transmac IC Card", its operator, Transmac decided that cardholders could have a free "transfer". However, under certain circumstances the card holder must pay a fare under MOP$3.00. (E.g., on a trip from the Border Gate to the M.U.S.T., if going to ride route 3A to Praça Ferreira Amaral to interchange to route MT2, the Green Macau Pass must be tapped on the reader, and the display will show 0.50. The exact fare to pay with the card was MOP$1.00, but the government supported MOP$0.50.) The details on transfers are located at the bottom.

Cards issued by Transmac (Transmac IC Card) (Not Available Now)

Macau Pass Traveler's Card ($130 MOP Each, deposit of MOP$30.00 is required)

Macau Pass Personalised Card

Macau Pass Elders Card

Macau Pass Student/Child Card

Notes
All Macau Passes and Transmac IC Cards DO NOT have the transfer offer for Macau-Taipa Routes coming back to Macau Peninsula and the fare display (On Macau Pass reader) displays $3.20
TCM offers transfer offers for Macau Pass holders. Details available at TCM's website.

Customer services
Macau Pass S.A.R.L. offers a variety of customer services that either can be troubleshooted online at Macau Pass Online or in person at the following Macau Pass approved customer service centers:

 Macau Pass Customer Service, near Rua Do Campo.
 Transmac Sales Center, near Portas Do Cerco (Border Gate)

Special liveries and versions

Coca-Cola
Macau Pass, Coca-Cola and Circle K Convenience Stores Macau Division have decided to introduce the "Coca-Cola 60 Years Limited Edition Macau Pass". This is made in honor to commemorate the 60th year of Coca-Cola being in Macau. The purchasing period for this livery is now suspended. The livery is as follows:

The front is the "Original" green Macau Pass livery
The back of the card is the "Special Edition" Coca-Cola livery.

There were two ways to have the ability to be the card holder of this card:

Pay MOP$39.00 at the checkout counter of Circle K stores across Macau (card has no power until loaded.)
Buy 2 (Two) Coca-Cola products at Circle K, and entered for a chance to win a MOP$1000.00 pre-loaded Macau Pass with the livery.

This card livery is a "purchase" card, no deposit needed, no refund on card.

Macau Pass Watch
When Macau Pass was introduced as the name "Macau Pass" (Green Livery) in 2007/8, Macau Pass S.A.R.L. had introduced the Macau Pass Watch which, much like the Octopus Card Watch, acts as another type of Macau Pass. There are two types of watches:

An Internal applied watch (Macau Pass is affixed on the inside)
An External applied watch (Macau Pass is affixed on the outside)

This card livery is a "purchase" card, no deposit needed, no refund on card.

M.U.S.T. Student/Staff Card

Macau Pass and M.U.S.T. also have a specialized staff/student I.D. card with a Macau Pass ability on the inside.

This card livery is a "purchased" card, provided by the supplier itself (M.U.S.T.)

J.T. Ticket Net

Macau Pass and the J.T. Ticket Net also introduced a card that has the Macau Pass Green livery on the front, and the J.T. Ticket Net livery on the back (Much like the Cola-Cola special livery)

This card livery is a "purchase" card, no deposit needed, no refund on card.

World Heritage Sites

The Tourism Board of Macau and Macau Pass have teamed up and made a series of Macau Pass Cards that has a World Heritage site on the front, and a rear view of the Macau Pass logo, the card number, and an array of all the World Heritage sites in Macau.

This card livery is a "purchase" card, no deposit needed, no refund on card.

See also
 Electronic money
 List of smart cards

References

Contactless smart cards
Fare collection systems in China
Transport in Macau